Letaba is a monotypic moth genus of the family Noctuidae. Its only species, Letaba noa, is found in Mexico. Both the genus and species were first described by Harrison Gray Dyar Jr. in 1912.

References

Agaristinae
Monotypic moth genera